The following highway are numbered S31:

Austria
  Burgenland Schnellstraße

United States
 County Route S31 (California)
 County Route S31 (Bergen County, New Jersey)